William A. Raidy (c. 1923September 4, 1993, New York City) was an American journalist who was longtime theatre critic of both Broadway and Off-Broadway productions in New York.

Life and career
Born in Manhattan, Raidy earned degrees from Georgetown University, New York University, and the Sorbonne. He also took theatre courses at the Yale School of Drama. He began his career in journalism in the mid 1940s as a features writer for the Long Island Press. In the mid 1960s he became the theatre critic for Newhouse News Service and The Star-Ledger, a position he remained in until his death three decades later. He died in 1993 at New York University Medical Center at the age of 70.

References

1920s births
1993 deaths
American theater critics
Georgetown University alumni
New York University alumni
Paris-Sorbonne University alumni
Writers from Manhattan